Mary Mitchell O'Connor (born 10 June 1959) is a former Irish Fine Gael politician who served as a Minister of State from 2017 to 2020 and Minister for Jobs, Enterprise and Innovation from 2016 to 2017. She served as a Teachta Dála (TD) for the Dún Laoghaire constituency from 2011 and 2020.

Early and personal life
Born Mary O'Connor in Milltown, County Galway. She graduated from Carysfort College and NUI, Maynooth, and worked as a teacher. She was appointed principal of Scoil Cholmcille, Skryne, County Meath. In 1999, she became school principal at The Harold School, Glasthule, a position she held until her election to the Dáil.

She lives in Cabinteely, Dublin. She is divorced and has two sons from her marriage.

Dún Laoghaire–Rathdown County Council: 2004–2011
In 2004, as a Progressive Democrats candidate, she was elected to Dún Laoghaire–Rathdown County Council. As a councillor, she campaigned against the reintroduction of university fees, against the budget-related increase in pupil-teacher ratios. In 2006, when the Maritime Museum closed, she called on the council to financially support it.

In December 2007, she resigned from the Progressive Democrats and joined Fine Gael. Welcoming her to the party, Enda Kenny said that it was "the first move by a Progressive Democrats public representative to join an alternative party since the general election". Mitchell O'Connor said that she "made a decision on how best to represent the people that elected me". In 2008–09, she was Chairperson of Dún Laoghaire Area Committee for Transport, Economic Development and Planning.

In June 2009, she was re-elected to Dún Laoghaire-Rathdown County Council. She was the Chairperson of Dún Laoghaire Area Committee for Environment, Housing, Culture, Community Development and Amenities. 

In August 2010, she called for a reform of Dáil Éireann, so that women can work efficiently there. She campaigned for the eviction of men who are perpetrators of domestic violence.

Dáil Éireann: 2011–2020
In December 2010, she was selected as a Fine Gael candidate for the Dún Laoghaire constituency.

Mitchell O'Connor was elected as a TD for the Dún Laoghaire constituency at the 2011 general election. The newly elected Fine Gael TD surprised staff at Leinster House on 2 March 2011, by driving her campaign car across the pedestrian plinth in the Dáil car park and down the steps.

On 8 June 2015, Mitchell O'Connor was selected by Dún Laoghaire Fine Gael as their candidate to contest the next general election at a selection convention. She defeated councillors Barry Ward and Maria Bailey, daughter of John Bailey, although Bailey was later added to the ticket, and both were elected. After a delay due to talks on government formation, Mitchell O'Connor was appointed Minister for Jobs, Enterprise and Innovation in May 2016. Faced with the challenges to Ireland posed by the 2016 British vote to leave the European Union, she set up a Brexit unit and boosted staffing in the Industrial Development Authority and Enterprise Ireland.

After Leo Varadkar was appointed Taoiseach in June 2017, she was not re-appointed to cabinet, but was instead appointed by the government as Minister of State at the Department of Education and Skills with responsibility for Higher Education. This was a "super junior" role which allowEd her attend cabinet meetings, without a vote. In November 2018, Mitchell O'Connor announced female only academic posts to increase the proportion of senior female academics in universities and institutes of technology in Ireland. There had never been a female university president in 400 years of higher education. She opened applications to the senior academic leadership initiative in June 2019.

In the 2020 general election, O'Connor stood for re-election but lost her seat.  The Irish Times reported her defeat as "the big surprise" of the Dún Laoghaire election.

Campaigns and policies
In July 2011, Mitchell O'Connor turned Leinster House pink in aid of breast cancer. Mitchell O'Connor is pro-choice and supported repealing the Eighth Amendment.

References

1959 births
Living people
Alumni of Carysfort College
Alumni of Maynooth University
Fine Gael TDs
Local councillors in Dún Laoghaire–Rathdown
Members of the 31st Dáil
Members of the 32nd Dáil
Ministers for Enterprise, Trade and Employment
Ministers of State of the 32nd Dáil
People from Dún Laoghaire
Politicians from County Galway
Progressive Democrats politicians
21st-century women Teachtaí Dála
Women government ministers of the Republic of Ireland
Women heads of schools in Ireland
Women ministers of state of the Republic of Ireland